Agent Armstrong is a platform game for PlayStation and Microsoft Windows developed by King of the Jungle and published by Virgin Interactive.

Plot 
In 1935, the British Secret Service's most respected asset, Agent Armstrong, must put a stop to a mysterious, evil organization known as the Syndicate. He has absconded from the Syndicate with plans that reveal their weaknesses. Armed with this information, he chases the Syndicate and their leader, Spats Falconetti, around the globe as they gradually take over the world.

Gameplay 

The game is a side-scrolling 3D platform game. Along with left to right movement, the character can also move back (away from the screen) and forwards (towards the screen). It is broken down into 30 levels taking place in various different locations such as Chicago and the Amazon. The player, armed with a gun and grenades must fight their way through various enemies and large mid-level and end-level bosses. In addition to simply killing enemies the game also contains mission based tasks or objectives that must be completed such as destroying Syndicate supply crates in the level.

The game also features several cutscenes and FMV sequences.

Development 
The game runs at 60 frames per second due to specially created set construction software.

Jolyon Myers, one of the lead developers stated in an interview with Retro Gamer magazine that parts of Agent Armstrong were inspired by the game ThunderJaws. He also states on his portfolio website that he created the backgrounds for the game in Deluxe Paint and the cover art and other renders using 3D studio.

Reception 
Computer and Video Games magazine gave the game 2 out of 5 stating that "the action is repetitive with the same old thing to do all the way through the game.

Jeuxvideo.com gave the game 14 out of 20 in a retrospective review in 2012.

References

External links
Agent Armstrong at GameSpot

1997 video games
King of the Jungle games
PlayStation (console) games
Single-player video games
Video games developed in the United Kingdom
Virgin Interactive games
Windows games